Transanal irrigation (TAI, also termed retrograde irrigation) of the rectum and colon is designed to assist the evacuation of feces from the bowel by introducing water into these compartments via the anus.

It is a treatment for persons with bowel dysfunction, including fecal incontinence and/or constipation (especially obstructed defecation). The impact of transanal irrigation varies considerably. Some individuals experience complete control of incontinence, and other report little or no benefit. Evidence show this treatment can be considered for children as well.

When diet and medication has proven ineffective, transanal irrigation is used.

Advantages and disadvantages
Possible advantages:
 Avoids surgery, medications, or other procedures
 By regularly emptying the bowel using transanal irrigation, controlled bowel function is often re-established to a high degree in patients with bowel dysfunction. This enables the users to develop a consistent bowel routine by choosing the time and place of evacuation.
 In patients with constipation, regular evacuation of the lower part of colon and rectum can accelerate transit through the entire colon. There has, perhaps unsurprisingly, been a rapid uptake of transanal irrigation methods in highly symptomatic patient groups with anorectal symptoms.
 In individuals with fecal incontinence, efficient emptying of the lower part of colon and rectum means that new feces may not reach the rectum for up to 2 days, which may prevent leakage between irrigations.
 May decrease the incidence of urinary tract infections in patients with neurogenic bowel and bladder problems

Possible disadvantages:
 Requires training by a healthcare professional so individual understands how to use the equipment
 A degree of dexterity is required to perform transanal irrigation at home. If the individual cannot perform the irrigation themselves, a carer may be required
 Periodic replacement of the equipment is needed, or microbial biofilms may start grow inside the tubing, contaminating the irrigation fluid. Current TAI devices offer single-use rectal catheters or cones.
 Persistent leaking of residual irrigation fluid after the irrigation may occur and make this option unhelpful as liquids are more difficult to retain than solids in persons with fecal incontinence.
 Complications such as electrolyte imbalance (not demonstrated when using either tap water or saline solution) and perforation (very rare).

Notes

References

Gastroenterology
Colorectal surgery